All Saints' Church, Weston is a Grade I listed parish church in the Church of England in Weston, Nottinghamshire.

History
The church was built in the 13th century. It was restored in 1768 and the 19th century.

Bells
The church has three change ringing bells and a sanctus bell. The three bells are unringable due to their dilapidated state. The treble is dated 1646 and was cast by George I Oldfield, the second dated 1500 and was cast by Richard Mellours & the tenor weighs 10 cwt and is dated 1888, it was cast by John Taylor & Co. It is not known who cast the sanctus bell, however it is dated 1699.

Tuxford Benefice
The Tuxford Benefice is made of five churches.
St Nicholas, Tuxford
All Saints, Weston
All Saints, West Markham
St Matthew, Normanton on Trent
St Wilfrid, Low Marnham

References

Church of England church buildings in Nottinghamshire
Grade I listed churches in Nottinghamshire